Lajos Szűcs (10 December 1943 – 12 July 2020) was a Hungarian football defender, who played for Dorog, Ferencváros, Budapest Honvéd FC and Vasas Izzó. He was Hungarian footballer of the year in 1968 and 1971.

He won a gold medal in football at the 1968 Summer Olympics and a silver medal in football at the 1972 Summer Olympics, and also participated in UEFA Euro 1972 for the Hungary national football team. He was Hungarian footballer of the year in 1968 and 1971.

Personal life
He was born in Apatin, Kingdom of Hungary (today in Serbia). He was married to Ildikó Pécsi, one of Hungary's best known and most popular actresses who also served as a Socialist member of the Hungarian Parliament from 1994 to 1998. He died on 12 July 2020 in Budapest at the age of 76.

Sources
 Ki kicsoda a magyar sportéletben?, III. kötet (S–Z). Szekszárd, Babits Kiadó, 1995, 181. o.,  
 Rejtő László–Lukács László–Szepesi György: Felejthetetlen 90 percek (Sportkiadó, 1977)  
 Rózsaligeti László: Magyar olimpiai lexikon. Budapest: Datus. 2000.  
 Bocsák Miklós: Hogyan élnek olimpiai bajnokaink? (Budapest, 1998)

References

1943 births
2020 deaths
People from Apatin
Hungarians in Vojvodina
Association football forwards
Hungarian footballers
Hungary international footballers
Újpest FC players
Budapest Honvéd FC players
Ferencvárosi TC footballers
UEFA Euro 1972 players
Olympic footballers of Hungary
Footballers at the 1968 Summer Olympics
Footballers at the 1972 Summer Olympics
Olympic gold medalists for Hungary
Olympic silver medalists for Hungary
Olympic medalists in football
Medalists at the 1972 Summer Olympics
Medalists at the 1968 Summer Olympics
Yugoslav emigrants to Hungary